The Football Players' Association of India or (FPAI) is an association for Indian association footballers. Created in 2006, it aims to "look after the welfare of players and educate and advice them by engaging professionals". It was created by former Indian national team captain Bhaichung Bhutia. In 2007, it got affiliated to FIFPro.

History 
The FPAI was formed on 13 August 2006 as a brainchild of India national football team's then captain Bhaichung Bhutia. He said that the body would "function as the parent body of the players" and added that it would "work with the national and state associations for the game's development" and ensure "fair treatment for footballers". Membership was opened to players, both Indian and foreign.

FPAI became an affiliate of FIFPro on 18 November 2009 at the FIFPro Congress in Budapest.

Awards 
In 2009, the FPAI announced of creating four awards — three to players and one to coach — after "some senior players" chose the nominations. Since 2022 the women counterparts of two awards were created. They were: 
 FPAI Indian Player of the Year (Men's and Women's)
 FPAI Foreign Player of the Year (Men's)
 FPAI Young Player of the Year (Men's and Women's)
 FPAI Coach of the Year (Men's)>

Key personnel

Management committee 
President: Renedy Singh (IMG-Reliance)
 Vice-presidents:
 Sunil Chhetri (Bengaluru FC, ISL)
 Abhishek Yadav (AIFF)
 Clifford Miranda (FC Goa, ISL)
 Alvito D'Cunha

Past Presidents 
 Bhaichung Bhutia (2006–2014)

See also 
 Football in India
 All India Football Federation

External links

References

2006 establishments in West Bengal
Trade unions in India
Trade unions established in 2006
Association football trade unions